The Carpetani (Greek: Karpetanoi) were one of the Celtic pre-Roman peoples of the Iberian Peninsula (the Roman Hispania, modern Spain and Portugal), akin to the Celtiberians, dwelling in the central part of the meseta - the high central upland plain of the Iberian Peninsula.

Location
Since the 5th century BC the Carpetani inhabited the Toledo and Alcaraz highland ranges along the middle Tagus basin, occupying a territory that stretched from the Guadarrama river at the north to the upper Anas (Guadiana) in the modern provinces of Guadalajara, Toledo, Madrid and Ciudad Real, an area designated as Carpetania in the ancient sources.  Main city-states (Civitates) in the region were Toletum (near modern Toledo; Roman or Celtiberian-type mint: Tole), Iplacea/Complutum (Alcalá de Henares – Madrid); Celtiberian-type mint: Ikezancom Konbouto?), Titulcia (El Cerrón, near modern Titulcia – Madrid), Consabura (Consuegra – Toledo), Barnacis (Orgaz – Ciudad Real; Celtiberian-type mint: Bornaiscom), Laminium (Argamasilla de Alba or Alhambra – Ciudad Real) and Alce (Campo de Criptana – Ciudad Real).  Towns of lesser importance were Aebura (Cuerva – Toledo), Metercosa (Madridejos – Toledo), Ispinum (Yepes – Toledo), Miaccum (Casa de Campo – Madrid), Mantua (Montiel – Ciudad Real), Thermida (Trillo – Guadalajara), Ilarcuris (Horche – Guadalajara) and Ilurbida (Lorvigo, near Talavera de la Reina – Toledo).

The exact location of the remaining Carpetanian towns is either uncertain or unknown, this is true in the cases of Dipo (near Toledo?), Libora, Varada, Caracca or Characa, Rigusa, Paterniana, and Alternia.

Origins
The origins of the Carpetani are obscure though their ruling elite certainly had Celtiberian and Gallic-Belgae elements, whose ancestors arrived to the Peninsula in the wake of the Celtic migration at the 4th century BC; the rest of the population was clearly Indo-European and very mixed, including people of native Ibero-Tartessian and Indo-Aryan affiliation.  Recent analysis of local epigraphic sources revealed that the Carpetani comprised some twenty-seven tribes, namely the Aelariques, Aeturiques, Arquioci, Acualiques, Bocouriques, Canbarici, Contucianci, Dagencii, Doviliques, Duitiques, Duniques, Elguismiques, Langioci, Longeidoci, Maganiques, Malugeniques, Manuciques, Maureici, Mesici, Metturici, Moenicci, Obisodiques, Pilonicori, Solici, Tirtaliques, Uloques, and Venatioques.

Culture
In archeological terms, it is now believed that they stemmed from both the transitional Late Bronze Age/early Iron Age ‘Campiñas de Madrid’ farmers’ and the ‘Cogotas I’ cultural groups.

Only a few Carpetanian towns appear to have issued their own currency, modelled after Roman patterns copied directly or adapted via Celtiberian coinage.  In the 2nd century BC, Iplacea/Complutum and Barnacis struck coins with their names marked in Celtiberian script, whilst later Toletum struck theirs bearing its name in Latin script.

History
By the later part of the 3rd century BC, the Carpetani had evolved into a sort of federation or loose tribal confederacy whose nominal capital was set at Toletum, with several centres of power in the main towns ruled by petty kings (Latin: Reguli). Some of these Rulers appear to have risen to prominence in the early 2nd century BC – one king Hilernus led a coalition of Carpetani, Vaccaei, Vettones and Celtiberians against consul Marcus Fulvius near Toletum in 193 BC, but he was defeated in battle and captured; another Regulus, Thurrus, ruler of Alce signed a treaty with Tiberius Sempronius Gracchus in 179 BC.
Prior to the Second Punic War, they opposed Carthaginian expansion in central Spain, but in 220 BC Hannibal defeated a combined force of Vaccaei, Olcades and Carpetani at the battle on the Tagus, thus completing his conquest of Hispania south of the Ebro with the exception of Saguntum.
They also provided mercenary troops to the Carthaginian armies, for Frontinus mentions the desertion of 3,000 Carpetani warriors from Hannibal’s army when he entered in Italy after crossing the Alps.

During the Sertorian Wars, the Carpetani remained loyal to Rome, whilst their perpetual rivals and enemies the Vettones and Celtiberians sided with Quintus Sertorius.

From 197 BC and over the next 170 years, the Roman Republic slowly expanded its control over Hispania. This was a gradual process of economic, diplomatic and cultural infiltration and colonisation, with campaigns of military suppression when there was native resistance, rather than the result of a single policy of conquest. The Romans turned some of the native cities into tributary cities and established outposts and Roman colonies to expand their control.

See also
Carpetania
Celtiberians
Celtiberian script
Vettones
Pre-Roman peoples of the Iberian Peninsula

Notes

Bibliography

 Ángel Montenegro et alii, Historia de España 2 - colonizaciones y formación de los pueblos prerromanos (1200-218 a.C), Editorial Gredos, Madrid (1989) 
 Francisco Burillo Mozota, Los Celtíberos - etnias y estados, Crítica, Barcelona (1998, revised edition 2007) 
Harry Morrison Hine, Hannibal's Battle on the Tagus (Polybius 3.14 and Livy 21.5), Latomus: revue d'études latines, Société d'Études Latines de Bruxelles 38 (4), Bruxelles (1979) 
 João Ferreira do Amaral, Os Filhos de Caim e Portugal - povos e migrações no II milénio a.C., Quetzal Editores, Lisbon (2004) 
 Juan Pereira Siesto (coord.), Prehistoria y Protohistoria de la Meseta Sur (Castilla-La Mancha), Biblioteca Añil n.º 31, ALMUD, Ediciones de Castilla-La Mancha, Ciudad Real (2007) 
 Julián Hurtado Aguña, Las gentilidades presentes en los testimonios epigráficos procedentes de la Meseta meridional, Boletín del Seminario de Estudios de Arte y Arqueología: BSAA, Tomo 69-70, (2003-2004) pp. 185–206.  - http://dialnet.unirioja.es/servlet/articulo?codigo=1404299

Philip Matyszak, Sertorius and the struggle for Spain, Pen & Sword Military, Barnsley (2013)

Further reading

Daniel Varga, The Roman Wars in Spain: The Military Confrontation with Guerrilla Warfare, Pen & Sword Military, Barnsley (2015) 
Ludwig Heinrich Dyck, The Roman Barbarian Wars: The Era of Roman Conquest, Author Solutions (2011) ISBNs 1426981821, 9781426981821

External links

Jesús R. Álvarez-Sanchís, "Oppida and Celtic society in western Spain," in e-Celtoi: Journal of Interdisciplinary Celtic Studies, Vol. 6 (The Celts in the Iberian Peninsula)
Detailed map of the Pre-Roman Peoples of Iberia (around 200 BC)
http://www.celtiberia.net

Pre-Roman peoples of the Iberian Peninsula
Celtic tribes of the Iberian Peninsula
Ancient peoples of Spain